"Alma Mater" is the 11th episode of first season of the British BBC anthology TV series Play for Today. The episode was a television play that was originally broadcast on 7 January 1971. "Alma Mater" was written by David Hodson, directed by James Ferman and produced by Irene Shubik.

In the play civil servant Jimmy Nicholson (Ian Carmichael) returns home after a long period working in the Middle East to visit his son at boarding school, the same school where he himself attended. It is the school's sports day, and old school grudges come flooding back.

The cast included Max Adrian, Hilda Braid, Nigel Hawthorne, Dinah Sheridan, Anthony Andrews and Christopher Reynalds.

No recording of this Play for Today is known to survive.

References

External links
 
 "Alma Mater" on the British Film Institute

1971 British television episodes
1971 television plays
British television plays
Play for Today
Lost BBC episodes